Howard William Olney  (born 7 October 1934) is the Australian Aboriginal Lands Commissioner.

Olney was born in Nedlands and attended Perth Modern School and the University of Western Australia. He was admitted as a solicitor in 1957 and as a magistrate in 1965, being called to the bar in 1974. He became Queen's Counsel in 1980 and served as a Labor member of the Western Australian Legislative Council from 1980 to 1982. From 1982 to 1988 he was a Justice of the Supreme Court of Western Australia, moving to the Federal Court from 1988 to 2003. There in 1998 he wrote the opinion that denied the Yorta Yorta native title claim in Members of the Yorta Yorta Aboriginal Community v Victoria. Between 2005 and 2011 he was an acting judge for the Supreme Court of the Northern Territory. He was appointed Aboriginal Lands Commissioner in 2007.

References

1934 births
Living people
Members of the Western Australian Legislative Council
Members of the Order of Australia
Australian King's Counsel
Judges of the Supreme Court of Western Australia
Judges of the Federal Court of Australia
People educated at Perth Modern School
Australian Labor Party members of the Parliament of Western Australia
People from Perth, Western Australia